The 1982 FIBA World Championship was the 9th FIBA World Championship, the international basketball world championship for men's teams. The tournament was hosted by Colombia from 15 to 28 August 1982.

Qualification

Venues

Competing nations

Preliminary round

Group A

Group B

Group C

Classification round

Semifinal round

Final round

Third place playoff

Final

Final rankings

Awards

All-Tournament Team

 Doc Rivers (USA)
 Dragan Kićanović (Yugoslavia)
 Juan Antonio San Epifanio (Spain)
 Vladimir Tkachenko (USSR)
 Anatoli Myshkin (USSR)

Top 10 scorers (points per game)
 Rolando Frazer (Panama) 24.4
 Ian Davies (Australia) 23.4
 Wilfredo Ruiz (Uruguay) 23.4
 Dié Drisa (Côte d'Ivoire) 21.6
 Dragan Kićanović (Yugoslavia) 21.1
 Oscar Schmidt (Brazil) 21.0
 Stanislav Kropilak (Czechoslovakia) 19.3
 Juan Antonio San Epifanio (Spain)	18.1
 Gustav Hraska (Czechoslovakia) 18.0
 Jay Triano (Canada) 17.9

References

External links
 
 

 
1982
International basketball competitions hosted by Colombia
1982 in basketball
1982 in Colombian sport